James A. Rutkowski (born April 6, 1942) is a retired American attorney and Democratic politician.  He served 27 years in the Wisconsin State Assembly (1971–1997) representing southwest Milwaukee County.

Biography
Rutkowski was born on April 6, 1942, in Milwaukee, Wisconsin. He graduated from Bay View High School and Marquette University. In 1966, Rutkowski joined the United States Army Reserve. After initially serving in the United States Army Security Agency, he transferred to the Judge Advocate General's Corps in 1969. He remained with the Reserve until 1972. Additionally, Rutkowksi was a member of the faculty at Marquette University and the University of Wisconsin–Milwaukee. He is a member of the Knights of Columbus and the United States Junior Chamber.

Political career
Rutkowski was elected to the Assembly in 1970. That same year, he was elected to be a trustee of Hales Corners, Wisconsin.  He was reelected to the Assembly 13 times and resigned in December 1997 to accept an appointment to the state Labor and Industry Review Commission.

References

Politicians from Milwaukee
Democratic Party members of the Wisconsin State Assembly
Military personnel from Milwaukee
United States Army officers
United States Army Judge Advocate General's Corps
Marquette University alumni
University of Wisconsin–Milwaukee faculty
1942 births
Living people
People from Hales Corners, Wisconsin